Morimospasma nitidituberculatum is a species of beetle in the family Cerambycidae. It was described by Hua in 1992.

References

Phrissomini
Beetles described in 1992